Kyūtai (球体) is the ninth album by Mucc, released on March 4, 2009. Daisuke from Kagerou sings the chorus on "Hōkō". Tracks 3 and 10 were produced with Ken from L'Arc-en-Ciel. Miya's mother sings the chorus on the 7-minute song "Sanbika", as the song was written about the death of his grandmother. The album reached number 12 on the Oricon chart.

Track listing

Other editions
Edition A: album plus bonus DVD: Live performance at The Fillmore, Irving Plaza in New York
Edition B: album plus bonus DVD: Documentary footage

References

2009 albums
Mucc albums
Universal Music Japan albums